is Japanese voice actress and singer Maaya Uchida's 9th single, released on July 10, 2019. The titular song from the single was used as the ending theme for the anime Ace of Diamond Act II.

Track listings

Charts

Event 
 『 Maaya Party！9』　Maaya Uchida 9th Single Release Event「Maaya Party！9」（July 20, 2019 - July 28, 2019：Osaka, Aichi, Tokyo）

Album

References

2019 singles
2019 songs
J-pop songs
Japanese-language songs
Pony Canyon singles
Anime songs